Qullqi (Aymara and Quechua for silver or money, also spelled Ccolcce, Ccolque, Collque, Colqui, Colque, Jollje) may refer to:

 Qullqi (Cusco), a mountain in the Cusco Region, Peru
 Qullqi (Lima), a mountain in the Lima Region, Peru
 Qullqi (Puno), a mountain in the Puno Region, Peru